are traditional Japanese fabric dividers hung between rooms, on walls, in doorways, or in windows. They usually have one or more vertical slits cut from the bottom to nearly the top of the fabric, allowing for easier passage or viewing.  are rectangular and come in many different materials, sizes, colours, and patterns.

Homes 
 were originally used to protect a house from wind, dust, and rain, as well as to keep a house warm on cold days and to provide shade on hot summer days. They can also be used for decorative purposes or for dividing a room into two separate spaces.

Businesses 
Exterior  are traditionally used by shops and restaurants as a means of protection from sun, wind, and dust, and for displaying a shop's name or logo. Names are often Japanese characters, especially kanji, but may be  emblems, Japanese rebus monograms, or abstract designs.  designs are generally traditional to complement their association with traditional establishments, but modern designs also exist. Interior  are often used to separate dining areas from kitchens or other preparation areas, which also prevents smoke or smells from escaping.

Because a  often features the shop name or logo, the word in Japanese may also refer to a company's brand value. Most notably, in Japanese accounting, the word  is used to describe the goodwill of a company after an acquisition.

They are also hung in the front entrance to a shop to signify that the establishment is open for business, and they are always taken down at the end of the business day.

See also 
 Curtain
 
 Portière (insulating door curtain)

References

External links 

Furnishings
Partitions in traditional Japanese architecture
Japanese words and phrases